Thomas Somers can refer to:

 Thomas Somers (athlete) (born 1997), British sprinter
 Thomas Somers (investor), American investor
 Thomas Somers (sailor) (1909–1984), British Olympic sailor